Mbia may refer to:

 Mbya, or Mbiá, the name of several ethnic groups and languages of South America
 MBIA, a financial services company
 Stéphane Mbia, Cameroonian footballer